Marek Kazimierz Cieślak (born 28 June 1950) is a Polish former speedway rider and current coach.

In 2007 he was a manager of Poland national team. Poland won Speedway World Cup and Team U-21 World Championship. After victory in SWC, on 30 July 2007 Polish president Lech Kaczyński honoured him Knight's Cross of Order of Polonia Restituta for prominent contributions for development of Polish speedway sport and for achievement in training work. In 2010, Cieślak was awarded the Officer's Cross of the Polonia Restituta for outstanding contribution to the development of speedway in Poland, for achievements in training and coaching.

World Final appearances

Individual World Championship
 1975 -  London, Wembley Stadium - 15th - 1 pt
 1976 -  Chorzów, Silesian Stadium - 13th - 4 pts
 1978 -  London, Wembley Stadium - 13th - 5 pts

World Team Cup
 1972 -  Olching, Olching Speedwaybahn (with Zenon Plech / Paweł Waloszek / Henryk Glücklich / Zdzisław Dobrucki) - 3rd - 21pts (0)
 1975 -  Norden, Motodrom Halbemond (with Henryk Glücklich / Edward Jancarz / Zenon Plech / Jerzy Rembas) - 4th - 9pt (4)
 1976 -  London, White City Stadium (with Edward Jancarz / Zenon Plech / Jerzy Rembas  / Bolesław Proch) - 2nd - 28pts (7)
 1977 -  Wrocław, Olympic Stadium (with Jerzy Rembas / Edward Jancarz / Bogusław Nowak /  Ryszard Fabiszewski) - 2nd - 25pts (2)
 1978 -  Landshut, Ellermühle Stadium (with Edward Jancarz / Zenon Plech / Jerzy Rembas / Andrzej Huszcza) - 3rd - 16+3pts (5)
 1979 -  London, Wembley Stadium (with Zenon Plech / Piotr Pyszny / Robert Słaboń / Andrzej Tkocz - 4th - 11pts (1)

Career history

Individual Polish Championship
 1971 - Rybnik - 14th place
 1972 - Bydgoszcz - 6th place
 1975 - Częstochowa - Silver medal
 1976 - Gorzów Wlkp. - 10th place
 1979 - Gorzów Wlkp. - 16th place

Polish Pairs Championship
 1976 - Gdańsk - Bronze medal
 1978 - Chorzów - 4th place

Polish League Championship
 1974 - Polish Champion
 1975 - Silver medal

British League
 1977 - Champions (White City Rebels)

Poland Golden Helmet
 1972 - 3rd place (72 points)
 1973 - 7th place (53 points)
 1975 - 5th place (59 points)
 1976 - Winner (54 points)

Poland Silver Helmet (U-21)
 1969 - 2nd place
 1972 - 3rd place

See also 
 Poland national speedway team

References

External links 
 Atlas Wrocław website

1950 births
Living people
Polish speedway riders
Polish sports coaches
Officers of the Order of Polonia Restituta
White City Rebels riders
People from Milanówek
Sportspeople from Masovian Voivodeship